Borivs'ka Andriyivka is a village in Izium Raion (district) in Kharkiv Oblast of eastern Ukraine, at about  south-east from the centre of Kharkiv city.

The village came under attack by Russian forces in 2022, during the Russian invasion of Ukraine, and was regained by Ukrainian forces in the beginning of October the same year.

References

Villages in Izium Raion